Béla Szekeres may refer to:

 Béla Szekeres (cyclist) (born 1933), Hungarian cyclist
 Béla Szekeres (runner) (1938-2000), Hungarian middle-distance runner